Ustaz Muhammad Waqas Khan (born May 6, 1969) is a Pakistani politician who has served the Jamaat e Islami from the time he was a teenager.

Education and early life 
Khan was born and raised in Rawalpindi in 1969. His forefathers belong to Khyber Pakhtunkhwa district Swabi. His father Dr. Muhammad Kamal (naib Ameer Pakistan) is the ex central President of Islami Jamiat Talaba Pakistan. His grandfather Khan Jan Muhammad was a close companion of Molana Syed Abul Ala Maudoodi. During his teenage Kahn shifted to Wah Cantt with his family. He passed his Metric From FG Model High school Wah Cantt. FSc from Govt College St Town Rawalpindi. He is a graduate of Punjab University. He earned his master's degree in political science from University of Peshawar in 1994.

Political career 
He won during the election of Punjab Assembly PP 8, and was an elected member of the, Provincial Assembly of Pakistan, PP-8 Wah Cantt. He is also ameer-e-jamaat Taxila and president of the political committee Punjab (N).

Literature 
Kahn has written wrote two books and several booklets, including Ar Rooh War reihan (Seerat un Nabi) Islami Falahi Riyasat.

2018 Elections 
Muhammad Waqas Khan: He is aspirant for coming General Election 2018.

References

Living people
1969 births